The Ntawere Formation is a Middle Triassic (Anisian) geological formation in Zambia, preserving fossils of synapsids, archosaurs, and temnospondyls.

Geology 
Several different facies are present in the Ntawere Formation, reconstructing a floodplain environment. The coarsest facies are trough cross-bedded conglomeratic sandstone full of mineral concretions. These coarse deposits formed in ancient channels such as riverbeds. Another type of facies involves thick beds of mudstone interbedding with thinner layers of fine-grained sandstone, indicating alternating low- and high-energy water flow within the channels. Graded sandstone to mudstone overbank deposits (complete with ripple marks) occur near channel deposits. Extensive successions of laminated or massive mudstone are common, often containing slickensides, calcareous nodules or layers (marls), and/or hematite nodules. These types of thick mud/marl layers likely formed in more quiet parts of the floodplain isolated from turbulent channels.

The floodplain was seemingly more active during the deposition of the Lower Ntaware Formation, as coarser sandstone channel fills are prevalent in that section while extensive mudstone layers are more common in the Upper Ntaware Formation. Fossils are typically found preserved in calcareous nodules in the mudstone of the Upper Ntaware, although they occur in some parts of the Lower Ntaware as well. The Ntaware Formation is an example of red beds, which are typically deposited in warm environments with seasonal ponds and rivers tied to wet and dry seasons.

Paleobiota

Invertebrates

Fish

Amphibians

Synapsids

Archosauromorphs

See also 
 Donguz Formation, contemporaneous fossiliferous formation of Russia
 Ermaying Formation, contemporaneous fossiliferous formation of China
 Manda Formation, contemporaneous fossiliferous formation of Tanzania
 Omingonde Formation, contemporaneous fossiliferous formation of Namibia
 Río Seco de la Quebrada Formation, contemporaneous fossiliferous formation of Argentina
 Yerrapalli Formation, contemporaneous fossiliferous formation of India

References

Further reading 

 K. D. Angielczyk, J. S. Steyer, C. A. Sidor, R. H. H. Smith, R. L. Whatley and S. Tolan. 2014. Permian and Triassic Dicynodont (Therapsida: Anomodontia) Faunas of the Luangwa Basin, Zambia: Taxonomic Update and Implications for Dicynodont Biogeography and Biostratigraphy. In C. F. Kammerer, K. D. Angielczyk and J. Fröbisch (eds.), Early Evolutionary History of the Synapsida 93-138
 A. R. Drysdall and J. W. Kitching. 1963. A re-examination of the Karroo succession and fossil localities of part of the Upper Luangwa Valley. Memoir of the Geological Survey of Northern Rhodesia 1:1-62

Geologic formations of Zambia
Triassic System of Africa
Anisian Stage
Sandstone formations
Marl formations
Lacustrine deposits
Paleontology in Zambia